Tom Hillmann is an American film and television actor best known for his role in The Outsiders. He has guest starred on The CW show Star-Crossed as Grayson's father. He has worked opposite David Caruso recurring as Special Agent Sackheim on the CBS crime series CSI: Miami as well as Denzel Washington in Out of Time.

In the 2015 theatrical release Paper Towns, he plays the father of the character played by Cara Delevingne.

Filmography

Film

Television

External links
Official Website

References

Year of birth missing (living people)
Living people